Carol Myers-Scotton (born 1934) is an American linguist. She was a Distinguished Professor Emerita in the Linguistics Program and Department of English at the University of South Carolina until 2003.

Education
She received her Bachelor of Arts from Grinnell College in 1955, and her Master of Arts in English in 1961 and Doctor of Philosophy in linguistics in 1967, both from the University of Wisconsin–Madison.

Career
She resided in Columbia, South Carolina until 2003, where she was Carolina Distinguished Professor at the University of South Carolina in the Linguistics Program and Department of English. She currently resides in Michigan, where she is an adjunct professor in the Department of Linguistics and Languages at Michigan State University, and also a visiting scholar at the MSU African Studies Center.

Publications and research
Myers-Scotton has authored or coauthored over 100 articles and book chapters in linguistics, primarily in the areas of contact linguistics, sociopragmatics, bilingualism and African linguistics. Much of her attention has been spent explaining the social and cognitive aspects of code-switching and bilingualism. In addition to her numerous articles, she has also published six books, including Contact Linguistics (2002) and Multiple Voices (2006).

Honors
Myers-Scotton has received many grants and honors, including a 1983 Fulbright Program grant to study language use patterns in Kenya and Zimbabwe, a 1994–1997 National Science Foundation grant to study grammatical constraints on code switching (with co-PI Jan Jake), and a 2004–2005 National Science Foundation grant to test a hypothesis about the grammatical aspects of the abruptness of language shift.  Specifically, the study dealt with Xhosa-English bilinguals in Gauteng Province in South Africa around Pretoria and Johannesburg.

References

External links
 Carol Myers-Scotton, website as retrieved by the Wayback Machine on 10 August 2019

1934 births
bilingualism and second-language acquisition researchers
Grinnell College alumni
Linguists from the United States
living people
University of South Carolina faculty
University of Wisconsin–Madison College of Letters and Science alumni
women linguists